Fusarium arthrosporioides is a fungal plant pathogen affecting chickpea.

See also
 List of chickpea diseases

References

arthrosporioides
Fungal plant pathogens and diseases
Pulse crop diseases
Fungi described in 1915